The women's 4 x 100 metres relay at the 2014 IAAF World Relays was held at the Thomas Robinson Stadium on 24 May.

Records
Prior to the competition, the records were as follows:

Schedule

Results

Heats

Qualification: First 2 of each heat (Q) plus the 2 fastest times (q) advanced to the final.

Final

Final B

Final A

References

4 x 100 metres relay
4 × 100 metres relay
2014 in women's athletics